iSKATE is an ice skating rink and café located on the 6th floor of the Ambience Mall in Gurugram, India. The skating rink is 15,000 sq. feet and was established on 18 December 2011.

According to Ice Skating Association of India, the rink is one of the best among the very few indoor ice skating rinks in the country.

References

External links
 

Sports venues in Haryana
Ice skating in India
Buildings and structures in Gurgaon
2011 establishments in Haryana
Sports venues completed in 2011